Ground pink is a common name of some flowering plants:

Some Dianthus species
Linanthus dianthiflorus, endemic to southern California
Phlox stolonifera, native to the eastern United States